Crazy Woman Creek is a creek in the United States, in Johnson County, Wyoming.

There are several legends about the name.  It was the site of a trading post and the site of battles in the American Indian Wars. It was also a locale of the Johnson County War.

An FAA-operated VOR navigation beacon, named after this area, is located about seven miles (12 km) southeast of the creek.  Crazy Woman VOR's FAA three-letter station designator is CZI.

The creek that winds and twists for a long distance is large enough that it is broken into three sections, an upper, middle and lower section.

External links and references
travel-to-wyoming.com on Crazy Woman Creek
More on the battle 
crazywomantradingco.com

Rivers of Wyoming
Bodies of water of Johnson County, Wyoming